Kalashnikovo is an urban locality (an urban-type settlement) in Likhoslavlsky District of Tver Oblast, Russia. Population:

History
Kalashnikovo was first mentioned in 1779 as a village belonging to the selo of Yegoryevskoye. At the time, it belonged to Novotorzhsky Uyezd of Tver Viceroyalty. In 1796, the viceroyalty was transformed to Tver Governorate. The village has grown considerably after the railway construction was completed in 1851, and even more after the glass factory has been constructed in 1886–1887. In 1918, the factory was nationalized.

On July 12, 1929 the governorates and uyezds were abolished. Likhoslavlsky District, with the administrative center in Likhoslavl, was established within Tver Okrug of Moscow Oblast. On July 23, 1930, the okrugs were abolished, and the districts were directly subordinated to the oblast. In 1932, Kalashnikovo was granted urban-type settlement status. On January 29, 1935 Kalinin Oblast was established, and Likhoslavlsky District was transferred to Kalinin Oblast. On July 9, 1937 Likhoslavlsky District was included into Karelian National Okrug, which was established as a Tver Karelians autonomy. On February 7, 1939 the okrug was abolished. In February 1963, during the abortive administrative reform by Nikita Khrushchev, Likhoslavlsky District was merged into Torzhoksky District, but on March 4, 1964, it was re-established. In 1990, Kalinin Oblast was renamed Tver Oblast.

Economy

Industry
As of 2014, the only industrial enterprise in Kalashnikovo produced electric lamps. This was the glassmaking factory founded in the 19th century.

Transportation
Kalashnikovo is served by a station on the Moscow – Saint Petersburg Railway. It is connected by road with Torzhok, whereby it has access to the M10 highway connecting Moscow and Saint Petersburg.

References

Notes

Sources

Urban-type settlements in Tver Oblast
Novotorzhsky Uyezd